is a Japanese publisher based on Shibuya, Tokyo. Accounted by the equity method of Culture Convenience Club, it was founded on June 5, 2006. In addition to publishing magazines and photobooks, the company also produces and sells home videos and music. It also deals with management of tarento and publishes the monthly manga magazine Comic Earth Star, and releases the manga under the Earth Star Comics line.

Publications
Comic Earth Star

References

External links

 
Comic book publishing companies in Tokyo
Manga distributors
Publishing companies established in 2006
Entertainment companies established in 2006
Japanese companies established in 2006